Losuia Airport is an airport in Losuia, on the island of Kiriwina, Papua New Guinea.

History
A C-47 was the first aircraft to land at the airfield on 2 August 1943. US Navy Seabees from the 60th Naval Construction Battalion expanded the airfield constructing a  taxiway, 25 fighter hardstands, a  taxiway and 16 bomber hardstands. Also known as South Drome, upon completion of North Drome on the northern part of Kiriwina.

Allied Units based at Kiriwina Airfield
 No. 22 Squadron RAAF - Douglas Boston
 No. 30 Squadron RAAF - Bristol Beaufighter
 No. 76 Squadron RAAF - Curtiss P-40 Kittyhawk
 No. 78 Squadron RAAF - Kittyhawks
 No. 79 Squadron RAAF - Supermarine Spitfire
 No. 6 Mobile Works Squadron RAAF
 No. 12 Repair and Salvage Unit RAAF
 No. 114 Mobile Fighter Sector RAAF

Airlines and destinations

References

Kiriwina Airfield

Airports in Papua New Guinea
Milne Bay Province